The 2008 United States Women's Curling Championship was held from February 16 to 23 at the Hibbing Curling Club in Hibbing, Minnesota. It was held in conjunction with the 2008 United States Men's Curling Championship. Team McCormick, led by Debbie McCormick, won the tournament for the third year in a row, a record for the US Nationals. With the win Team McCormick earned the opportunity to represent the United States at the 2009 World Women's Championship held in Gangneung, South Korea, where they finished 9th.

Teams
Seven teams competed in the 2008 Championship. It would have been eight teams but Alex Carlson's team chose to withdraw to focus on the 2008 US Junior Championships, which were held just before the Women's Championship, February 2 to 9.

Round robin standings 
Final round robin standings.

Round robin results 
All draw times are listed in Central Standard Time (UTC−6).

Draw 1 
Monday, February 18, 8:00am

Draw 2 
Monday, February 18, 4:00pm

Draw 3 
Tuesday, February 19, 9:00am

Draw 4 
Tuesday, February 19, 7:00pm

Draw 5 
Wednesday, February 20, 12:00pm

Draw 6 
Wednesday, February 20, 8:00pm

Draw 7 
Thursday, February 21, 12:00pm

Playoffs

1 vs. 2 
Friday, February 22, 12:00pm

3 vs. 4 
Friday, February 22, 12:00pm

Semifinal 
Friday, February 22, 7:00pm

Final 
Saturday, February 23, 11:00 am

References 

United States National Curling Championships
Women's curling competitions in the United States
Curling in Minnesota
United States Women's Championship
Curling United States Women's Championship
Curling United States Women's Championship
Hibbing, Minnesota
Women's sports in Minnesota
Events in St. Louis County, Minnesota